San Francisco del Norte is a municipality in the Chinandega department of Nicaragua.

Municipalities of the Chinandega Department